Hyotissa mcgintyi, also known as Parahyotissa mcgintyi, is a species of medium-sized saltwater "oyster", a marine bivalve mollusk in the family Gryphaeidae. This species occurs in the western Atlantic Ocean. Species in this genus are known as "honeycomb oysters" or "foam oysters" because under magnification, the majority of their shell structure is characteristically foam-like.

References

 The original paper about the discovery of Hyotissa hyotis in the Florida Keys, which also mentions this species
 Paula M. Mikkelsen and Rudiger Bieler, 2008, Seashells of Southern Florida: Living Marine mollusks of the Florida Keys and adjacent regions, Princeton University Press, Princeton and Oxford,  

Gryphaeidae
Molluscs described in 1985